Mike or Michael Randall may refer to:
Mike Randall (journalist) (1919–1999), British newspaper editor
Mike Randall (entertainer) (born 1953), American actor and meteorologist
Mike Randall (skier) (born 1962),  American Nordic combined skier
Michael Randall, musician with Blackhawk